Country and West is a studio album by American country music artist Dottie West. It was released in May 1970 on RCA Victor Records and was produced by Danny Davis. Her fourteenth studio album, Country and West spawned one single that became a minor hit on the national publication charts in 1970. It was also one of three studio albums West would release in 1970.

Background and content
Country and West was recorded at RCA Studio B in February 1970. The sessions were produced by Danny Davis and was West's second studio album to be fully produced by him. Davis had also written the liner notes for the project. "Being her producer for recordings I am probably more critical of what she sings than any of her listeners, and to me she is 'something wonderful'," he commented. The album was a collection of 11 tracks. Some of the songs were recordings while others were cover versions. Country and West included cover versions of Merle Haggard's "Today I Started Loving You Again", Tammy Wynette's "I Stayed Long Enough", Dolly Parton's "As Long as I Love You" and Ernest Tubb's "Tomorrow Never Comes". It was one of West's few RCA studio releases to not include a self-penned track. West's songwriting collaborator, Red Lane, did contribute to composing the single "It's Dawned on Me You're Gone".

Release and reception
Country and West was released in May 1970 on RCA Victor Records, becoming her fourteenth studio recording. It was issued on a vinyl LP, featuring six songs on "side one" and five songs on "side two" of the record. The album did not reach any peak positions on the Billboard charts following its release. However, it did spawn one single. Spending ten weeks on the Billboard Hot Country Singles chart, "It's Dawned on Me You're Gone" would peak at number 37 in September 1970. Following its release, the project was reviewed favorably by Billboard magazine. In their June 1970 issue, writers called the album "a powerful package", praising West's vocals and Davis' production. "The vocalist has a style which radiates individuality and warmth and she is excellently produced by Danny Davis," writers commented.

Track listing

Personnel
All credits are adapted from the liner notes of Country and West.

Musical personnel
 Larry Butler – piano
 Kenneth Buttrey – drums
 Pete Drake – steel guitar
 Buddy Harman – drums
 Roy Huskey – bass
 The Jordanaires – background vocals
 Millie Kirkham – background vocals
 Grady Martin – guitar
 Norbert Putnam – bass
 Jerry Shook – guitar
 Bobby Thompson – banjo
 Pete Wade – guitar
 Bill West – steel guitar
 Dottie West – lead vocals
 James Wilkerson – guitar

Technical personnel
 Danny Davis – producer 
 Tom Pick – engineering
 Al Puchucki – engineering
 Roy Shockley – recording technician
 Tasso Vendikos – photography

Release history

References

External links
LP Discography entry for Country and West

1970 albums
Albums produced by Danny Davis (country musician)
Dottie West albums
RCA Records albums